Ninus, according to Greek historians writing in the Hellenistic period and later, was the founder of Nineveh (also called Νίνου πόλις "city of Ninus" in Greek), ancient capital of Assyria. The figure or figures with which he corresponds in Assyrian records is uncertain; an association or identification with Ninurta has been proposed. An identification with Shamshi-Adad I, Shamshi-Adad V, and/or a conflation of the two have also been suggested.

In Hellenic historiography
Many early accomplishments are attributed to Ninus, such as training the first hunting dogs, and taming horses for riding. For this accomplishment, he is sometimes represented in Greek mythology as a centaur.

The figures of King Ninus and Queen Semiramis first appear in the history of Persia written by Ctesias of Cnidus (c. 400 BC), who claimed, as court physician to Artaxerxes II, to have access to the royal historical records. Ctesias' account was later expanded on by Diodorus Siculus.  Ninus continued to be mentioned by European historians (e.g. Alfred the Great), until knowledge of cuneiform enabled a more precise reconstruction of Assyrian and Babylonian history from the mid 19th century onwards. 

He was said to have been the son of Belus or Bel, a name that may represent a Semitic title such as Ba'al, "lord" (the famous name of a "god" whom Elijah opposed in 1 Kings 17ff). According to Castor of Rhodes (apud Syncellus p. 167), his reign lasted 52 years, its commencement falling in 2189 BC according to Ctesias. He was reputed to have conquered the whole of western Asia in 17 years with the help of Ariaeus, king of Arabia, and to have founded the first empire, defeating the legendary kings Barzanes of Armenia (whom he spared) and Pharnus of Media (whom he had crucified). 

As the story goes, Ninus, having conquered all neighboring Asian countries apart from India and Bactriana, then made war on Oxyartes, king of Bactriana, with an army of nearly two million, taking all but the capital, Bactra. During the siege of Bactra, he met Semiramis, the wife of one of his officers, Onnes, whom he took from her husband and married. The fruit of the marriage was Ninyas, said to have succeeded Ninus. 

Ctesias (as known from Diodorus) also related that after the death of Ninus, his widow Semiramis, who was rumored to have murdered Ninus, erected to him a temple-tomb, 9 stadia high and 10 stadia broad, near Babylon, where the story of Pyramus and Thisbe (Πύραμος; Θίσβη) was later based. She was further said to have made war on the last remaining independent monarch in Asia, king Stabrobates of India, but was defeated and wounded, abdicating in favour of her son Ninyas.

Identifications
A number of historians, beginning with the Roman Cephalion (c. AD 120) asserted that Ninus' opponent, the king of Bactria, was actually Zoroaster (or first of several to bear this name), rather than Oxyartes.  

Ninus was first identified in the Recognitions (part of Clementine literature) with the biblical Nimrod, who, the author says, taught the Persians to worship fire. In many modern interpretations of the Hebrew text of Genesis 10, it is Nimrod, the son of Cush, who founded Nineveh; other translations (e.g., the KJV) render the same Torah verse as naming Ashur (Assyria), son of Shem, as the founder of Nineveh. 

More recently, the identification in Recognitions of Nimrod with Ninus (and also with Zoroaster, as in Homilies) formed a major part of Alexander Hislop's thesis in the 19th century tract The Two Babylons.

Historicity
The decipherment of a vast quantity of cuneiform texts has allowed modern Assyriologists to piece together a more accurate history of Sumer, Akkad, Babylonia, Assyria, and Chaldea. Ninus is not attested in any of the extensive king lists compiled by the Mesopotamians themselves, nor mentioned in any Mesopotamian literature, and it is possible that this Hellenic creation was inspired by the deeds of one or more real kings of Assyria, or Assyro-Babylonian mythology. Similarly, the Biblical character of Nimrod is not attested anywhere in Assyrian, Babylonian, Akkadian or Sumerian literature or king lists, but is believed by many scholars to have been inspired by one or more real kings, the most likely believed to be Tukulti-Ninurta I of Assyria who ruled the Middle Assyrian Empire during the 13th century BC, or the Assyrian war god Ninurta. An Assyrian queen Shammuramat is known to be historical, and for five years from 811 BC ruled the Neo-Assyrian Empire as regent for her son Adad-nirari III, and had been the wife of Shamshi-Adad V. The later Hellenic myths surrounding Semiramis are considered by some to be inspired by the novelty of a woman ruling such an empire.

In culture
Shakespeare's A Midsummer Night's Dream has the story of Pyramus and Thisbe as a play-within-a-play. The actors constantly mispronounce the location "Ninus' Tomb" as "Ninny's Tomb," though they are corrected initially, and in vain, by "director" Peter Quince.

The story of Ninus and Semiramis is taken up in a different form in a 1st-century AD Hellenistic romance called the Ninus Romance, the Novel of Ninus and Semiramis, or the Ninus Fragments.  A scene from it is perhaps depicted in mosaics from Antioch on the Orontes.

Spencer's Faerie Queene refers to Ninus’ pride in Canto V, verse XLVIII:
And after him old Ninus farre did pas
In princely pompe, of all the world obayd
There also was that mightie Monarch layd
Low under all, yet above all in pride

In his compendium, the Etymologiae, Isidore of Seville claimed that idolatry was the invention of Ninus, who had a gold statue made of his father Belus, which he worshipped. This claim was highly influential throughout the medieval period into the Early Modern.

Sources

Full account in Diodorus

Ancient Assyrians
Hellenistic historiography
Legendary monarchs
Nimrod

el:Νίνος